Sascha Pichler (born 31 January 1986) is an Austrian footballer who currently plays for Austrian team 1. FC Bisamberg.

Club career
Pichler came through the Rapid Wien youth ranks, but made his Austrian Bundesliga debut for eternal rivals Austria Wien in 2002–03. He only made one substitute appearance in that title-winning season. He spent a season at Fiorentina but returned to playing action with LASK in Austria's Second Division in 2005 and winning promotion in 2007. Early 2008 he was loaned out to SC Schwanenstadt.

Honours
Austrian Football Bundesliga (1):
 2003

External links
Player profile - LASK
Profile - Austria Archive

1986 births
Footballers from Vienna
Living people
Austrian footballers
Austria youth international footballers
Association football forwards
FK Austria Wien players
ACF Fiorentina players
LASK players
SC Schwanenstadt players
FC Waidhofen/Ybbs players
SV Horn players
Austrian Football Bundesliga players
2. Liga (Austria) players
Austrian Regionalliga players
Austrian 2. Landesliga players
Austrian expatriate footballers
Expatriate footballers in Italy